"Dime Piece" is a song released as a single by Bulgarian singer LiLana. The song features American hip hop veteran Snoop Dogg and fellow Bulgarian rapper Big Sha. The track is produced by Ariel Rodriguez and was released as a single on April 24, 2009 in Bulgaria, along with a music video. The digital premiere of the song in the United States was made in June 2009 and the single's premiere worldwide (not including Bulgaria) was published on September 20, 2009.

The remix version of the song was released on September 29, 2009.

Music video

The music video premiered together with the single on April 24, 2009 in various Bulgarian music channels. It was shot in Los Angeles and it was directed by Morocco Vaughn. The video includes cameo appearances by Don "Magic" Juan and Coldhard from Chicago rap group Crucial Conflict.

The remix video premiered on September 29, 2009.

References

External links

2009 singles
Snoop Dogg songs
2009 songs
Universal Music Group singles